Hanna Schwamborn (born September 4, 1992) is a German actress who is best known for her role as Lavinia in the Dutch film De Brief voor de Koning which is based on the book of the same name from Dutch writer Tonke Dragt.

Her first film was Good Bye, Lenin! (2003) where she plays the role of Carla, the little sister of Daniel Brühl. She has been featured in the 2008 film Ljubav i drugi zločini during the Berlinale and also in the movie Stella und der Stern des Orients.

She plays small roles in several German television. Schwamborn lives in Bremen.

Filmography

References

External links

1992 births
Living people
Actresses from Berlin
German film actresses
21st-century German actresses